Sing Tao Holdings Limited was a Bermuda-incorporated company, but headquartered in Hong Kong. The company was listed in The Stock Exchange of Hong Kong. The company was a media and property conglomerate until it was dismantled in 2002. After selling the main media business and subsequent takeover in mid-2002, the legal person of the listed company, along with its property business, was renamed into Shanghai Ming Yuan Holdings.

Sing Tao Holdings and its predecessor Sing Tao Limited were majority owned by founder Aw Boon Haw, his daughter Sally Aw and other family members for almost 50 years. Facing financial troubles, Sally Aw sold the controlling stake to a private equity fund of Lazard in 1999. It was then acquired by Charles Ho's listed company Global China Technology Group in January 2001. However, in mid-2002 it was re-sold to a Chinese private company Ming Yuan Investment Group, but excluding Sing Tao's main business: newspaper (as Sing Tao Media Holdings) as well as a hotel in Canada.

In February 2020, the wholly owned subsidiary in Australia was liquidated with over 20 long serving staff made unemployed without notice and their entitlements not paid by the company. Newsagents were pursued for unsold newspapers and not credited for returns.

Around 1991, the group also owned a travel agency, a medical centre, a recording studio and a pharmaceutical company.

History

Predecessor

A family-held publisher
The predecessor of Sing Tao Holdings as a parent company of Sing Tao Group, was Sing Tao Limited, which was incorporated on 22 October 1951 as Sin Poh Amalgamated (H.K.) Limited. It replaced "Sing Tao Jih Pao Limited" as the parent company of the group, which the latter was incorporated on 29 June 1938.

It was renamed to Sing Tao Newspapers Limited on 27 May 1972 and Sing Tao Limited on 13 February 1986. At first, the main business of the company was the publisher of Sing Tao Daily and Sing Tao Wan Pao.

According to the Annual Return filed to the Hong Kong Company Registries in 1952, Aw Boon Haw owned 630 out of 1500 shares of the company; other shareholders were his sons (Aw Kow 60; Aw Swan, 60; Aw It Haw 100; Aw Sze Haw 100), daughters (Sally Aw and Aw Sing 60 each), nephews (Aw Cheng Chye, and Aw Cheng Taik, 60 each) and grandson, daughters and third generation relatives (total 310 shares held by 9 persons), for a total of 18 persons. , son of Aw Boon Haw, who helped the family to found Sing Tao Daily, died in January 1951 due to a plane crash. The shareholder structure also making other newspapers that founded by Aw family in other city, did not have any relation with each other as parent company and subsidiary.

Sally Aw also replaced his foster brother Aw Swan as the head of Sing Tao Daily in mid-1952, as Aw Swan allegedly borrow money by using his foster father's name without his consent. Aw Boon Haw even made a public announcement to renounce his relationship with Aw Swan.

After the death of Aw Boon Haw in 1954, Aw Cheng Chye, eldest son of Aw Boon Haw's brother Aw Boon Par (b.1888, d.1944), was the general manager of Singapore-based Eng Aun Tong, the maker of Tiger Balm, while Sally Aw, became the head of Sin Poh Amalgamated (H.K.) Limited, which she was the largest shareholder among the family member. , Sally Aw's brother, Aw Kow, was also a director of Sin Chew Jit Poh of Singapore and Malaysia; her brother, Aw Swan, was the general manager of Sin Chew Jit Poh from June 1971 to circa 1972; while her cousin Aw Cheng Taik was the managing director of Singapore Tiger Standard until it was defunct in the 1950s. Widow of Aw Hoe, Chan Sow Yong, also served as an executive of Sing Tao.

, Sally Aw another brother, Aw It Haw still owned a minority stake in Sin Poh Amalgamated (H.K.), and also served as a director.

Aw Toke Tone, son of Aw Hoe, was the managing director of Hong Kong Tiger Standard in 1967.

Initial public offering and diversification
The shares of Sing Tao Newspapers Limited was once traded in Far East Exchange and Kam Ngan Stock Exchange from 1972, the predecessors of The Stock Exchange of Hong Kong. The initial public offering price was HK$6. Sing Tao's shared was traded in [old] Hong Kong Stock Exchange Limited since 1977. Sing Tao's listing was only few years behind the listing of Haw Par Brothers International, a Singapore company held by Singapore-based branch of Aw family. Moreover, the publisher of  Hong Kong Tiger Standard was changed from "The Tiger Standard Limited" to "Hong Kong Standard Newspapers Limited" circa early 1970s (the latter was incorporated on 28 August 1970). The former was owned by Aw family directly but the latter was a subsidiary of Sing Tao Newspapers Limited in the late 1970s for 55% shares. It was owned by Aw Toke Tone, the eldest son of the late Aw Hoe for about 90% in 1970.

In October 1972, it was announced that a subsidiary (provisional Chinese name ) was formed to invest in real estate. The group purchased a land lease on 838 Lai Chi Kok Road, Kowloon (New Kowloon Inland Lot No.5567) to build a printing factory and commercial floor area for lease in 1974. In 1977, it was announced that the group had formed its own recording studio and photography processing centre that open to retail customers.

According to 1977–78 result announcement, Sing Tao Group had also expanded into travel agency, medical centre and pharmaceutical industry. By 1979, Sing Tao operated their printing and publishing business as ), as well as Leefung-Asco's joint venture South China Printing Co., Ltd. Sing Tao also invested 49% stake in a documentary studio Farkas Studios in 1979.

Privatization and second IPO
In 1985, the company was privatised by Sally Aw via an Australian-listed company Cereus Australia for a reported price HK$13 per share (HK$11.5 cash and 1 share of Cinclus.) However, shares owned by Aw family members would only receive HK$9 per share (HK$7.5 cash and 1 share of Cinclus). The deal also made Cinclus had a wide shareholders base to apply for listing as a replacement of Sing Tao.

Sing Tao and now independent listed company  (ex-Cinclus), via an investment vehicle Scilla Limited, made a high-profile purchase on a land lease (Kowloon Inland Lot No.10722) in Canton Road, Tsim Sha Tsui, Kowloon in October 1985. The newspaper credited the land lease was the "Land King of Canton Road". The price was HK$630 million (HK$705 per gross floor area). It was reported that the consortium had re-sold the land lease to other real estate developer in 1986, which the location was now known as Lippo Sun Plaza, The Sun Arcade and a hotel, The Langham (Hong Kong).

However, less than a year of privatisation, Sing Tao Newspapers Limited was renamed to Sing Tao Limited; the company started another IPO in 1986 and traded on the Stock Exchange of Hong Kong Limited on 19 March of the same year. It was reported that 75% shares were old shares that was sold by Cereus Australia's wholly owned subsidiary Cereus Newspapers (Hong Kong) Limited and only 25% were new shares.

In 1987, Sally Aw owned 101,385,026 number of shares directly while her nephew Aw Toke Tone owned 216,000 directly; they did not owned any of the subsidiaries of Sing Tao Limited, including "Hong Kong Standard Newspapers Limited" which Aw Toke Tone owned a minority stake in the late 1970s to 1984.

Sing Tao Holdings
Circa 1989 a Bermuda-incorporated company Sing Tao Holdings Limited replaced Sing Tao Limited as the holding company of the group. At the same time, Cereus Australia, the investment vehicle Aw used to privatise Sing Tao in 1985, was delisted on the Australian Securities Exchange in the same year by Kargat Pty Limited. The ex-parent company was engaged in property investment in Sydney.

According to a book published by the Chinese University of Hong Kong, citing a document that Sing Tao Holdings was a diversified conglomerate already in 1989, which only 7.7% revenue was from the newspaper despite 50% investments were newspaper related.

The company published the Sing Tao Daily, the oldest surviving Chinese language daily newspaper in Hong Kong, which is also published overseas editions in New York City, San Francisco, Vancouver, Toronto, London, Paris, Sydney and Melbourne. The first edition was published in 1938.

It also published the English business newspaper The Standard in Hong Kong.

Sing Tao also published the evening edition of Sing Tao Daily, known as Sing Tao Wan Pao. The version discontinued in 1996.

The company also operates several printing businesses, most notably the South China Printing Company (1988) Limited.

Sing Tao Sports Club Limited, a professional football club founded by Sally Aw and Hsu King Shing (the coach of Sing Tao SC before its incorporation), was later owned by Sing Tao Limited and Wong Yue Kai (an accountant of Sing Tao Holdings). The paid-in share capital of the club was remained unchanged for many year for just HK$200.

In 1990s Sing Tao Holdings also acquired another listed company Jademan Holdings (a new Bermuda-incorporated parent company  was found in 1993 to replace Jademan Holdings as the listed company) Jademan Holdings was the publisher of another newspaper Tin Tin Daily News. A subsidiary, Sing Tao Newspapers (Canada 1988) Limited, was also turned to a 50–50 joint venture between Sing Tao Holdings and Toronto Star Newspapers Limited in the same year. Toronto Star Newspapers also acquired 75% stake of Canada-incorporated Sing Tao Daily Limited, the publisher of Canada edition.

Sing Tao management found guilty of fudging circulation numbers

In 1998, members of the management team were found guilty of falsifying circulation numbers for The Standard newspaper, to attract advertisers and to raise the revenue of the newspapers. According to a report by the Center for International Media Assistance, the circulation of Sing Tao Daily and most major Beijing-friendly Chinese newspapers with overseas editions were remain unaudited, and therefore vulnerable to exaggeration:

The Standard were audited by Hong Kong Audit Bureau of Circulations Limited as of 2012.

The case, later known as Hongkong Standard case or Sally Aw case was criticised by the public by not suing Sally Aw, the chairwoman of Sing Tao Holdings. Chief executive of Hong Kong, Tung Chee-hwa, in the "Report on the key issues during the second year of the Hong Kong Special Administrative Region of the People's Republic of China" made a defence for decision of the Secretary for Justice Elsie Leung.

However, Tung Chee-chen, brother of Tung Chee-hwa, was an independent non-executive director of Sing Tao Holdings since December 1996, while Tung Chee-hwa also served the same position in the 1980s to the 1990s. It was reported that Tung Chee-hwa was a family friend of Sally Aw.

Takeover and dismantle
As of 1998, the company was still owned by Sally Aw, the daughter of the founder of Sing Tao Daily for 50.04%. It was reported that Aw agreed to sell 23% shares of the company, to Dublin-listed private equity fund China Enterprise Development Fund for a reported HK$115.8 million (HK$1.20 per share) in December 1998. However, Lazard Asia won the final bid to become the controlling shareholder for a reported HK$269 million (HK$1.25 per share). According to Charles Ho who bought Sing Tao Holdings in 2001 from Lazard,  also made an attempt to buy Sing Tao, but collapsed. However, Cha denied any formal agreement was signed. Ho's grandfather Ho Ying-chie, also filed a bankruptcy petition against Aw in January 1999. According to Ho Ying-chie, he had lent Aw HK$270 million. According to a reporter, Cha's listed company  did announce a deal with Aw to form a new holding company for Sing Tao Holdings in May 1998, but the deal collapsed in June.

During Lazard as the major shareholder, Hong Kong banker Cheung Din Youn (brother of Barry Cheung) was the chairman and Charles Ho was the honorary chairman and an independent non-executive director.

In mid-1999, Sing Tao SC stopped its operation as a football club. The legal entity of the company was used for other business in 2010 as Sing Tao Media Services, by its new owner Sing Tao News Corporation after many years of dormant.

In 2000, Sing Tao Holdings re-launched The Standard in tabloid format.

In January 2001, Global China Technology Group, majority owned by Charles Ho, acquired approximately 51.36% shares of Sing Tao Holdings from Astral Light Investments Limited, a subsidiary of Lazard Asia Fund A, L.P., for HK355.6 million (HK$1.65 per share).

In January 2002 South China Printing, Noble World Printing, Roman Financial Press, Valiant Packaging Holdings and their subsidiaries were sold from Sing Tao Holdings to Asia Printers Group for HK$428 million; Asia Printers Group was owned by CVC Capital Partners and Citigroup.

In August 2002 the shares of Sing Tao Holdings that held by Global China Technology Group (74.5%), was sold to a private company Ming Yuan Investment Group for HK163.8 million (HK$0.524 per share). Ming Yuan Investment Group was owned by Yao Yuan. However, the shares of Sing Tao Media Holdings, a subsidiary of Sing Tao Holdings, were distributed to the shareholders of Sing Tao Holdings before the takeover by Yao. Global China Technology Group offered to the public shareholders of Sing Tao Media Holdings after the transaction, to buy the shares of Sing Tao Media Holdings by offering the shares of Global China Technology Group, in a ratio of 1 to 1.75. The deal making the shareholder of Sing Tao Holdings at that time, would owned the shares of both Shanghai Ming Yuan Holdings (ex-Sing Tao Holdings) and Global China Technology Group if they did not sell the shares before the transactions.

The residual assets at the 2002 takeover was mainly property investment such as properties in Saba Road, Richmond, British Columbia and in Wyndham Place, Hong Kong. However, it excluded Colony Hotel in Toronto.

Footnotes

References

Companies formerly listed on the Hong Kong Stock Exchange
Holding companies of Hong Kong
Holding companies of Bermuda
Defunct companies of Hong Kong
Defunct companies of Bermuda
Newspaper companies of Hong Kong
Conglomerate companies of Hong Kong
Real estate companies of Hong Kong
Pharmaceutical companies of Hong Kong
Real estate companies of Canada
Offshore companies of Bermuda
Conglomerate companies established in 1951
1951 establishments in Hong Kong
1989 establishments in Bermuda
Companies disestablished in 2002
2002 disestablishments in Hong Kong
2002 disestablishments in Bermuda
Aw family
Family-owned companies of Hong Kong
Sing Tao News Corporation